Ellen McCourt (born January 1984) is a British trade unionist, and the main representative for junior doctors at the British Medical Association (BMA) during a dispute about their new contract of employment.

Early life and education
She was born in Newcastle, and grew up in the west of Whitley Bay. Her parents, Kath and James McCourt, married in 1981. She has a younger brother.

Her mother, Professor Kath McCourt, is a former head of the governing council of the Royal College of Nursing (RCN). Kath McCourt retired in 2016 as the dean of the Faculty of Health and Life Sciences at the Northumbria University (former Newcastle Polytechnic before 1992), and was awarded the CBE in the 2012 Birthday Honours.

In 2006 Ellen McCourt gained a BSc in medical science from the University of St Andrews. In 2009 she gained an MBChB from the University of Manchester. She has recently completed an MSc in global health with global surgery at King's College London (KCL).

Career

Medical posts
She did a foundation programme in the North West, and a core surgery programme in the North East. She completed a year as an orthopaedic registrar.

She works in the Yorkshire region as a trainee in emergency medicine.

British Medical Association
Ellen McCourt joined the BMA as a student in 2005, and became active within it in 2013.  She became chair of the junior doctors' committee (JDC) of the BMA in July 2016, following a vote by junior doctors to reject a new contract of employment imposed by the health secretary Jeremy Hunt.

See also
 List of health and medical strikes
 Medical education in the United Kingdom

References

External links
 Ellen McCourt biography, BMA

1984 births
Alumni of King's College London
Alumni of the University of Manchester
Alumni of the University of St Andrews
21st-century English medical doctors
British trade unionists
English women medical doctors
People from Whitley Bay
Trade unionists from Tyne and Wear
Living people
21st-century women physicians
21st-century English women